Leigh Lake is located in Grand Teton National Park, in the U. S. state of Wyoming. Situated just southeast of Mount Moran, the lake is at the terminus of both Paintbrush and Leigh Canyons. The lake can be accessed from the Leigh Lake Trail which follows the eastern shores of String Lake a distance of one mile (1.6 km) and is an easy hike over level terrain. The Leigh Lake Ranger Patrol Cabin is located on the northeast shore of the lake and is on the National Register of Historic Places.

The lake was named for Richard "Beaver Dick" Leigh, a mountain guide.

See also
Geology of the Grand Teton area

References

Lakes of Grand Teton National Park